Tallachula Creek is a stream in the U.S. state of Mississippi.

Tallachula is a name derived from the Choctaw language purported to mean either "marked palmetto" or "marked rock". Variant names are "Conda Creek", "Tali Chulok Creek", and "Tallachuluk Creek".

References

Rivers of Mississippi
Rivers of Kemper County, Mississippi
Mississippi placenames of Native American origin